Fortepian  is a village in the administrative district of Gmina Biecz, within Gorlice County, Lesser Poland Voivodeship, in southern Poland.

The village's name is the Polish word for piano.

References

Fortepian